Unió Esportiva Castelldefels is a Spanish football team based in Castelldefels, in the autonomous community of Catalonia. Founded in 1948 it currently plays in Tercera División RFEF – Group 5, holding home matches at Municipal Els Canyars, with a capacity for 2,500 spectators.

History

The club was officially founded on 15 April 1948. Francisco Casacuberta, who was then the Mayor of Castelldefels, became its first president. The first kit for the team was originally red and white shirt and white shorts. It eventually moved to a yellow shirt with blue shorts.

In the 2007–08, the club served as the reserve team of UE Miapuesta Castelldefels, team moved from Figueres to the city who played in Segunda División B. The agreement only lasted one season.

Season to season

17 seasons in Tercera División
1 season in Tercera División RFEF

Notes

External links

External links
Official website 
Futbolme team profile 

Football clubs in Catalonia
Association football clubs established in 1948
1948 establishments in Spain